Thibault Lacroix (born 14 May 1985) is a French rugby union player. Lacroix, who is a centre, plays his club rugby for Bayonne. He made his debut for France against Australia on 28 June 2008.

References

External links 
 Thibault Lacroix Official Website

1985 births
Living people
People from Niort
French rugby union players
Rugby union centres
France international rugby union players
Biarritz Olympique players
Stade Français players
Sportspeople from Deux-Sèvres